The Abbeville and Waycross Railroad was incorporated in 1889. The company started building a line between Abbeville, Georgia and Fitzgerald, Georgia in 1890 and finished in 1896. A thirteen-mile stretch of track between Abbeville and Bowens Mill was opened in 1890 and in 1891 was extended to Lulaville. In 1896, entrepreneur John Skelton Williams bought the Abbeville and Waycross Railroad and extended it nine miles from Fitzgerald, Georgia to Ocilla, Georgia. Shortly after that, the Abbeville and Waycross Railroad became part of the Georgia and Alabama Railroad. The tracks from Abbeville to Fitzgerald were abandoned in 1971, but the tracks from Fitzgerald remained in operation until 1990.

External links

Railroad History

Defunct Georgia (U.S. state) railroads
Railway companies established in 1889
Railway companies disestablished in 1896
Predecessors of the Seaboard Air Line Railroad
1889 establishments in Georgia (U.S. state)